Wetter is a surname. Notable people with the surname include:

Bruce Wetter, American novelist
Ernst Wetter (1877–1963), Swiss politician
Friedrich Wetter (born 1928), German cardinal archbishop of Munich and Freising
Harry Wetter (1882–1934), Welsh international rugby union player
Jack Wetter (1887–1967), Welsh international rugby union player

German-language surnames
Surnames from nicknames